Count György Apponyi de Nagyappony (29 December 1808 – 28 February 1899) was a Hungarian conservative politician, who served as Lord Chancellor of Hungary from 1846 to 1848. He was a member of the Hungarian Academy of Sciences since 1858.
He was appointed Speaker of the House of Magnates in 1861 when Emperor Francis Joseph I convened Hungarian Diet of 1861. As leader of the "old conservative" group he participated in development of the Austro-Hungarian Compromise after 1862.

Career

György Apponyi came from the noble Apponyi family. He served as a secretary of the Hungarian Court Chancellery. From 1843/44 he became politically active. As the court chancellor, he led from 1844 to the conservative-aristocratic party, and brought as a staunch opponent of all Hungarian nationalist aspirations through its system of Komitatsadministratoren the opposition against her. An agreement with opposition leader Lajos Kossuth failed because of the outbreak of the revolution of 1848/49.

As unemployed by the revolution in Hungary, he retired, first, in 1859, Count Apponyi became a lifelong member of the Vienna Parliament. He fought for the independence of Hungary and was an influential leader of the national party. On 20 October 1860 he was Judex Curiae in Pest, where he chaired the conference for the reorganization of the Hungarian jurisdiction.

As an authorized Commissioner, he opened on 6 April 1861 the Parliament in Budapest led the bureau and the House of Magnates. After the dissolution of the Diet (21 August), he remained in office as Judex Curiae. Hopes that he would balance between Austria and Hungary to bring about came true, not, whereupon it on 8 April 1863 resigned his office. Apart from his participation in the state parliament in 1865 and several meetings of the House of Magnates since withdrawn from living in Pozsony.

His son was Albert Apponyi, Speaker of the House of Representatives, Minister of Religion and Education and leader of the Hungarian delegation to the Versailles Peace Conference to present Hungary’s case to the Allied and Associated Powers assembled there to determine the terms of the peace treaty with Hungary, which subsequently became known as the Treaty of Trianon on account of it having been signed in the Grand Hall of the Palace of Trianon.

References
 Magyar életrajzi lexikon I. (A–K). ed. Kenyeres, Ágnes. Budapest: Akadémiai. 1967. pp. 47–48
 Meyers Konversations-Lexikon, 1888
 Apponyi, Georg Graf . In: Österreichisches Biographisches Lexikon 1815–1950 (ÖBL). Band 1, Verlag der Österreichischen Akademie der Wissenschaften, Wien 1957, S. 27.
 Constantin von Wurzbach: Apponyi, Georg Graf. In: Biographisches Lexikon des Kaiserthums Oesterreich.  Band 1. Verlag L. C. Zamarski, Wien 1856–1891, S. 57.

1808 births
1899 deaths
Politicians from Bratislava
Hungarian nobility
Speakers of the House of Magnates
Members of the Hungarian Academy of Sciences
Gyorgy
19th-century Hungarian politicians